Seosan  is a city in South Chungcheong Province, South Korea, with a population of roughly 175,000 according to the 2017 census. Seosan is the hub of transportation of the west coast where the Seohaean Expressway, Daejeon-Dangjin Expressway, National Highways No. 29, 32, 38 and 45 intersect. This city has great traffic conditions towards the metropolitan area and major cities.

Culture and tourism 
Although Seosan itself is a fairly quiet and touristically unimportant city, there are a number of minor attractions in the rural areas outside of Seosan, most of which can be accessed within twenty minutes by car, or in an hour by bicycle. Many of these historic sites are well-known only among the locals and often have few visitors, which can make them appealing to those wishing to escape the crowded palaces and temples of Korea's major cities. For an exhaustive list of tourist attractions in the Seosan-Haemi area, detailed English-language maps are available at the Seosan Intercity Bus Terminal.

Haemieupseong Fortress (해미읍성) 
Haemieupseong Fortress was completed in 1491 (22nd year of King Seongjong's reign), and surrounded the entirety of Haemi-eup at the time of its completion. The fortress was used as a military command post controlling the Chuncheong-do region, and provided defense against Japanese pirates along Korea's western coast. As the town of Haemi expanded in the early 20th century, much of the fortress was torn down to allow additional urban development, but a major restoration work was undertaken in 1973. Today, the South Gate of Haemieupseong Fortress is original, along with certain parts of the walls, while the other gates are reconstructions. Along with Yeosutgol, Haemieupseong Fortress is considered to be a Holy Ground among Korean Catholics due to the Byeongin Persecutions of 1866, during which many Catholics living in the Chuncheong area were killed at the fortress.

Yeosutgol Holy Ground (해미순교성지) 
Approximately 200 meters from Haemieupseong Fortress is the Yeosutgol Holy Ground, where Korean Catholics were buried alive, drowned and otherwise killed en masse during the Byeongin Persecutions. Although most of the site's remains were washed away by flooding, some of them were rediscovered in 1935. The site now contains a large memorial hall devoted to those who were martyred for their faith, and is now a major Catholic pilgrimage site.

Yeonghyeon-ri Rock-carved Buddha Triad (용현리 마애여래삼존상) 
During the Three Kingdoms Period (~ 57 BCE - 668 CE), the Seosan-Haemi area was under the control of the Kingdom of Baekje (백제), and although there are very few ruins from this period in the Seosan-Haemi area, the Yeonghyeon-ri Rock-carved Buddha triad is a phenomenal exception. Carved in either the late 6th or early 7th century CE, the carving consists of a Buddha standing on a lotus leaf, flanked by two Bodhisattva. Although this carving has been designated a National Treasure of Korea, it receives relatively few visitors due to its isolation. The carving is best viewed in the morning, when the entirety of the triad is illuminated by the rising sun, and is accessible by local buses from Seosan and Unsan-ri, or by a half-hour drive or ninety-minute bike ride directly from Seosan.

Bowonsa (보원사지) 
Built during the Unified Silla Period (668 - 935 CE), this small temple contains an iconic Baekje-style Pagoda, as well as a number of monuments which were added when the temple was expanded during the Goryeo Dynasty (918 - 1392 CE), and is considered to be a National Treasure of Korea. Bowonsa is about 500 meters from the Yeonghyeon-ri Rock-carved Buddha Triad, and is a quiet place for relaxation and meditation.

Gaesimsa (개심사) 
Built in 1484 (15th year of King Seongjong's reign), Gaesimsa is one of only a handful of wooden buildings in Korea which date past the 17th century. The temple houses an Amitabha Buddha statue carved in the 14th century, as well as a hanging mural painted in the 15th century, both of which have won Gaesimsa the title of National Treasure of Korea. At the temple's rear is a mountain path which links to the Aramegil Hiking Trails, and can be used to reach Bowonsa and Yeonghyeon-ri on foot within a 90-120 minute hike.

Climate
As with most of South Korea, Seosan has a humid subtropical climate/humid continental climate (Cfa/Dfa). In spring, mild temperatures are accompanied by strong winds bearing dust from the Chinese mainland. This unpleasant dust is named Hwangsa (황사) or Asian Dust, and prompts many Seosanites to wear face masks when walking or cycling. Seosan and the surrounding area are quite beautiful in Spring, however, particularly in the mountains and in Seosan's Lake Park. In summer, the monsoon season lasts about three weeks in June or July, and is characterised by very strong winds and heavy rainfall, although the severity of both of these phenomena have been decreasing in recent years. Seosan may be affected by mild typhoons during the summer season, as was the case in 2010, when Seosan was damaged by typhoon 'Kompasu'. Fall typically begins in mid-September and temperatures begin to drop rapidly by November. Snow generally appears in late November or early December, and continues until late February or early March. With the exception of occasionally snow storms, snowfall is generally very mild and rarely causes inconveniences for local traffic. The average temperature in Seosan is 11.8 degrees Celsius.

Education 
The university provides courses in Chiropractic, a wide range of liberal arts, design, and engineering disciplines, and hosts aviation and flight-training schools.

Cityscape

Transportation
Seosan is served by Express and Intercity buses. Under optimal conditions, Express buses can reach Seoul's Gangnam Terminal in approximately 90 minutes, but can take up to 2.5 hours in the event of heavy traffic. Express buses to Seoul's Gangnam Terminal depart every half-hour, while intercity buses to other locations depart every hour.

A number of local buses serve the Seosan-Haemi area, with a fare between 960 and 1450 won.

Notable people from Seosan

 Rain (born Jung Ji-hoon; June 25, 1982), singer and actor
 Byul (born Kim Go-eun; October 22, 1983), singer
 Kim Kiri (born November 27, 1985), comedian

Local Specialties
Seosan is renowned for its locally farmed oysters and garlic, as well as a number of specialty dishes including gegukji and marinated blue crab with soybean sauce.

Related cities

Related cities
 Tenri, Nara, Japan
 Takko, Aomori, Japan
 Rongcheng, Shandong, China

Friendship cooperation cities
 Hefei, Anhui, China

See also

 Chungcheongnam-do
 Geography of South Korea
 List of cities in South Korea
 Plan for Tidal Power Plant in Garorim Bay
 Sim Soo-bong (singer and songwriter from Seosan, known in particular by hit "One million of scarlet roses (백만송이 장미)")

References

External links

Official government website

 
Cities in South Chungcheong Province
Port cities and towns in South Korea